Nallanthuvanar (Tamil: நல்லந்துவனார்), also known in full as Madurai Aasiriyar Nallanthuvanar (Tamil: மதுரையாசிரியர் நல்லந்துவனார்), was a poet of the Sangam period, to whom 39 verses of the Sangam literature has been attributed, in addition to verse 18 of the Tiruvalluva Maalai.

Biography
Nallanthuvanar was born as "Anthuvan" and was known for his erudition in Tamil language and astronomy. He was praised by poet Madurai Marudhan Ilanaganar.

Contribution to the Sangam literature
Nallanthuvanar has written 39 Sangam verse, including 4 in Paripaadal (verses 6, 8, 11, and 20), 1 in Agananuru (verse 43), 1 in Natrinai (verse 88), and 33 in Kalithogai, besides verse 18 of the Tiruvalluva Maalai. In addition to composing the Kalithogai verses, he also compiled the work of Kalithogai and wrote its invocation verse.

See also

 Sangam literature
 List of Sangam poets
 Tiruvalluva Maalai

Notes

Tamil philosophy
Tamil poets
Sangam poets
Tiruvalluva Maalai contributors